Year 1447 (MCDXLVII) was a common year starting on Sunday (link will display the full calendar) of the Julian calendar.

Events 
<onlyinclude>

January–December 
 March 6 – Pope Nicholas V succeeds Pope Eugene IV, to become the 208th pope.
 March 16 – A major fire destroys the centre of Valencia.
 December
Vlad II Dracul, ruler of Wallachia, and his eldest son Mircea are assassinated. Vladislav II succeeds him, with the assistance of John Hunyadi.
The Albanian–Venetian War of 1447–48 begins.

Date unknown 
 Roman II seizes the throne of Moldavia after killing his uncle, Stephen II, and will have his other uncle, Petru as co-ruler.
 The Siege of Soest occurs, in the course of the Soest Feud.
 According to Ryū'''s own sources, Iizasa Ienao founds Tenshin Shōden Katori Shintō-ryū, the earliest historically verifiable Japanese koryū martial art, that is still extant in modern times.</onlyinclude>

 Births 
 February 1 – Eberhard II, Duke of Württemberg (d. 1504)
 February 4 – Lodovico Lazzarelli, Italian poet (d. 1500)
 April 5 – Catherine of Genoa, Italian author and nurse (d. 1510)
 April 17 – Baptista Mantuanus, poet & carmelite (d. 1516)
 June 27 – Jean IV de Rieux, Breton noble and Marshal (d. 1518)
 July 5 – Costanzo I Sforza, Italian noble (d. 1483)
 July 6 – Jean IV de Rieux, Breton noble and Marshal (d. 1518)
 September 10 – Paolo da San Leocadio, Italian painter in Spain (d. 1520)
 October 30 – Lucas Watzenrode, Prince-Bishop of Warmia (d. 1512)
 December 3 – Bayezid II, Ottoman Sultan (d. 1512)
 December 9 – Chenghua Emperor of China (d. 1487)
 December 15 – Albert IV, Duke of Bavaria (d. 1508)
 date unknown Piero Capponi, Italian soldier and statesman (d. 1496)
 Philippe de Commines, Flemish historian (d. 1511)
 Catherine of Genoa, Catholic mystic (d. 1510)
 probable 
 Giovanni Antonio Amadeo, Italian sculptor (d. 1522)

 Deaths 
 February 23
 Pope Eugene IV (b. 1383)
 Humphrey, Duke of Gloucester (b. 1390)
 March 6 – Colette of Corbie, French abbess and saint in the Catholic Church (b. 1381)
 March 13 – Shahrukh Mirza, ruler of Persia and Transoxonia (b. 1377)
 March 31 – Robert Long, English politician (b. 1390)
 April 11 – Henry Beaufort, Cardinal, Lord Chancellor of England (b. 1377)
 April 22 – Yaqub al-Charkhi, Sufism (b. 1359)
 May 1 – Louis VII, Duke of Bavaria-Ingolstadt (b. 1368)
 May 12 – Hein Hoyer, German politician (13__-1447) (b. 1380)
 July 6 – António Martins de Chaves, Catholic cardinal (b. 1390)
 July 9 – Gruffudd Vychan, Welsh knight (b. 1390)
 July 22 – Stephen II of Moldavia, Prince of Moldavia (b. 1410)
 August 5 – John Holland, 2nd Duke of Exeter (b. 1395)
 August 9 – Konrad IV the Older, Polish priest (b. 1380)
 August 13 – Filippo Maria Visconti, Duke of Milan (b. 1392)
 October 31 – Tommaso Bellacci, Italian Roman Catholic professed member of the Third Order of Saint Francis (b. 1370)
 November 17 – Euphemia of Münsterberg, German sovereign (b. 1385)
 November 21 – Biagio Molino, Roman Catholic patriarch (b. 1380)
 December ~ Vlad II Dracul, Prince of Wallachia, and his son Mircea II
 unknown'' – Stephen II of Moldavia

References 

 New Advent. (2020). 'Pope Nicholas V'. Retrieved from http://www.newadvent.org/cathen/11058a.htm
 https://www.hisdates.com/years/1447-historical-events.html
 https://www.onthisday.com/date/1447